Pavel Vladimirovich Pervushin (5 September 1947 – 24 September 2022) was a Soviet heavyweight weightlifter. In 1973 he won the Soviet, European and world titles. Between 1971 and 1973 he set 15 ratified world records: nine in the snatch, four in the clean and jerk and two in the total. He was not selected for the 1972 Olympics due to a strong competition within the Soviet team.

Pervushin took up weightlifting in 1964. After the 1973 World Championships he severely injured his wrist, but recovered by 1975 when he won the Soviet Cup. He retired after another injury in 1976 and later worked as a sports instructor in several military institutions.

References

1947 births
2022 deaths
People from Vologda Oblast
Soviet male weightlifters
European Weightlifting Championships medalists
World Weightlifting Championships medalists
European champions in weightlifting
Honoured Masters of Sport of the USSR